Lynette Woodard (born August 12, 1959) is a retired American basketball Hall of Fame player and former head women's basketball coach at Winthrop University. Woodard made history by becoming the first female member of the Harlem Globetrotters and who, at age 38, began playing as one of the oldest members in the newly formed American women's professional basketball league, the WNBA.

While at Wichita North High School, Woodard won two state basketball titles.

Woodard went on to play college basketball with the University of Kansas (KU) in 1978, playing there until 1981. She was a four-time All-American at KU, and she averaged 26 points per game and scored 3,649 points in total during her four years there, and was the first KU woman to be honored by having her jersey retired.  She is major college basketball's career women's scoring leader.

In 1981, she was signed by an Italian team, UFO Schio (Vicenza), to participate in their league.

In 1984, she was a member of the United States' women's basketball team that won the gold medal at the Los Angeles Olympic Games.

In 1985, Woodard became the first woman ever to play with the Globetrotters. Incidentally, Woodard's cousin, Hubert "Geese" Ausbie, also played for the Globetrotters from 1961 to 1985.

In 1989, she was inducted into the National High School Hall of Fame. In 1990, she was inducted into the Kansas Sports Hall of Fame, and was signed by a Japanese women's team to play in their country.  She played there until 1993.

In 1997, she was signed by the Cleveland Rockers of the newly founded Women's National Basketball Association (WNBA). The following year, she was selected in an expansion draft by the Detroit Shock.  During the WNBA's off-season, she began working as a stockbroker in New York City.

She retired from playing in 1999 and returned to KU serving as Assistant Coach of the women's basketball team. In late January 2004, she was named Interim Head Coach filling for the regular coach Marian Washington, who had retired due to medical reasons. She also served as Athletics Director for the Kansas City, Missouri School District from 1992 to 1994.

In September 2004, she was inducted into the Naismith Memorial Basketball Hall of Fame in Springfield, Massachusetts. In June 2005, she was inducted into the Women's Basketball Hall of Fame in Knoxville, Tennessee.

Woodard also received the 2015 WBCBL Women's Professional Basketball "Trailblazer" Award on August 2, 2015, along with 9 other female basketball Icons including Cynthia Cooper, Nancy Lieberman, Sarah Campbell, E.C. Hill, Geri Kay Hart, Robelyn Garcia, Kandi Conda, Lisa Leslie and Tamika Catchings. The award recognizes some of the most influential people in professional women's basketball, specifically those who helped blaze the trail, shape the overall landscape and pave the way for women's professional basketball.

Woodard became a financial consultant for A.G. Edwards & Sons Inc., in Wichita.

In 2017, she was named the head coach of the Winthrop Eagles women's basketball team.

Kansas statistics

USA Basketball
Woodard was named to the team representing the US at the 1979 World University Games, held in Mexico City, Mexico. The USA team won all seven games to take the gold medal. The USA team played and beat Cuba twice, the team that had defeated them at the Pan Am games. Woodard averaged 14.1 points per game.

Woodard was selected to be a member of the team representing the US at the 1980 Olympics, but the team did not go, due to the 1980 Olympic boycott. The team did go 6–1 in Olympic Qualifying games, with Woodard scoring 4.5 points per game.

Woodard was selected to be a member of the team representing the US at the 1983 Pan American Games held in Caracas, Venezuela. The team won all five games to earn the gold medal for the event. Woodard averaged 19.0 points per game and 4.0 rebounds per game, both second best on the team.

Woodard played for the USA National team in the 1983 World Championships, held in Sao Paulo, Brazil. The team won six games, but lost two against the Soviet Union. In an opening round game, the USA team had a nine-point lead at halftime, but the Soviets came back to take the lead, and a final shot by the USA failed to drop, leaving the USSR team with a one-point victory 85–84. The USA team won their next four games, setting up the gold medal game against USSR. This game was also close, and was tied at 82 points each with six seconds to go in the game. The Soviets Elena Chausova received the inbounds pass and hit the game winning shot in the final seconds, giving the USSR team the gold medal with a score of 84–82. The USA team earned the silver medal. Woodard averaged 15.8 points per game, second highest on the team, and recorded 33 steals to lead the team.

Woodard was a member of the USA National team at the 1990 World Championships, held in Kuala Lumpur, Malaysia. The team won their opening round games fairly easily, with the closest of the first three games a 27-point victory over Czechoslovakia. Then they faced Cuba, a team that had beaten the US in exhibition matches only a few weeks earlier. The USA team was losing at halftime, but came back to win 87–78. The USA team found itself behind at halftime to Canada in their next game, but came back to win easily 95–70. After an easy match against Bulgaria, the USA team faced Czechoslovakia again, and achieved an almost identical result, winning 87–59. In the title match, the USA team won the gold medal with a score of 88–78. Woodard averaged 6.3 points per game.

In 1984, the USA sent its National team to the 1984 William Jones Cup competition in Taipei, Taiwan, for pre-Olympic practice. The team easily beat each of the eight teams they played, winning by an average of just under 50 points per game. Woodard averaged 11.6 points per game.

Woodard played with the USA team at the 1991 Pan American Games. The team finished with a record of 4–2, but managed to win the bronze medal. The USA team lost a three-point game to Brazil, then responded with wins over Argentina and Cuba, earning a spot in the medal round. The next game was a rematch against Cuba, and this time the team from Cuba won a five-point game. The USA beat Canada easily to win the bronze. Woodard averaged 2.3 points per game.

Awards and honors
 1981: Winner of the Broderick Award (now the Honda Sports Award) for basketball
 1981: Wade Trophy
 2015: WBCBL Professional Basketball Trailblazer Award
 2020: Brookwood Alpacas Elementary Award

References

Sources

External links
Basketball Hall of Fame biography
2015 Women's Blue Chip Basketball Trailblazers

1959 births
African-American basketball players
All-American college women's basketball players
American stockbrokers
American women's basketball coaches
American women's basketball players
Basketball coaches from Kansas
Basketball players at the 1983 Pan American Games
Basketball players at the 1984 Summer Olympics
Basketball players at the 1991 Pan American Games
Basketball players from Wichita, Kansas
Cleveland Rockers players
Detroit Shock players
Harlem Globetrotters players
Kansas Jayhawks women's basketball players
Living people
Medalists at the 1979 Summer Universiade
Medalists at the 1983 Pan American Games
Medalists at the 1984 Summer Olympics
Medalists at the 1991 Pan American Games
Naismith Memorial Basketball Hall of Fame inductees
Olympic gold medalists for the United States in basketball
Pan American Games bronze medalists for the United States
Pan American Games gold medalists for the United States
Pan American Games medalists in basketball
Parade High School All-Americans (girls' basketball)
Shooting guards
Universiade gold medalists for the United States
Universiade medalists in basketball
Winthrop Eagles women's basketball coaches
Women stockbrokers
21st-century African-American people
21st-century African-American women
20th-century African-American sportspeople
20th-century African-American women
United States women's national basketball team players